DeRogatis is a surname. Notable people with the surname include:

Al DeRogatis (1927–1995), American football player and sports announcer
Jim DeRogatis (born 1964), American music critic and professor
Teresa de Rogatis (1893–1979), Italian composer, guitarist, pianist and music teacher.